Valentin Greissing (also Valentin von Greißing, Valentinus Greisingius; 1635–17 September 1701) was a Lutheran theologian, philologist, and educator.

He was born and died in Kronstadt. He studied at the University of Wittenberg, and later taught at the gymnasium in Stettin. In 1684 he was named rector at the gymnasium in Kronstadt, and in 1694 he was elected pastor at the Marktes in Rosenau.

Published works 
.
. Wittenberg 1677.
. Coronae 1693 typis L. Seuleri.
.
.
 .

References
Eugen von Trauschenfels: Greißing, Valentin von. In: Allgemeine Deutsche Biographie (ADB). Band 9, Duncker & Humblot, Leipzig 1879, S. 635 f.
Greisingius, Valentinus. In: Johann Heinrich Zedler: Grosses vollständiges Universal-Lexicon Aller Wissenschafften und Künste. Band 11, Leipzig 1735, Spalte 822.
Matthias Wolfes: GREISSING, Valentin. In: Biographisch-Bibliographisches Kirchenlexikon (BBKL). Band 18, Bautz, Herzberg 2001, Sp. 541–544.

German philologists
17th-century German Protestant theologians
German male non-fiction writers
1635 births
1701 deaths
People from Brașov
University of Wittenberg alumni
17th-century German writers
17th-century German male writers